Christian Witness Ministries (CWM) is a non-denominational church affiliation founded by the former National General Secretary of the Assemblies of God in Australia 1989-1992, Philip Powell. CWM publishes a quarterly magazine, Contending Earnestly for The Faith (CETF), of which Philip Powell is the editor (B. Michael Bigg assistant editor) and to which a number of authors from different backgrounds contribute, including Dave Hunt (Christian apologist), Bill Randles, Mike Gendron, Aeron Morgan, Jeffrey Whittaker, Mark Mullins, Roger Winter-Smith, and Larry DeBruyn. CWM also runs a bookshop and conducts Bible conferences and ministry tours featuring the above speakers plus Justin Peters and Peter Stokes. CWM is a watchman discernment ministry.

History
Philip Powell left the Australian Assemblies of God in 1992, believing that the church was preaching false doctrines and supporting false prophets and teachers. After his departure from the AOG, Powell became associated with others, who have come to similar conclusions. Philip with his wife, Kathleen launched Christian Witness Ministries in 1994, and began to publish a quarterly magazine entitled Contending EARNESTLY for THE Faith (CETF) out of Hamilton, New Zealand. There are now clearing offices in Australia and the UK as well as in New Zealand. The magazine is now published from Brisbane, Australia.

References

External links
 

Pentecostal churches in Australia
Christian magazines
Mass media in Brisbane
Pentecostalism in Australia
Magazines with year of establishment missing
Magazines published in Australia
Magazines published in New Zealand
Mass media in Hamilton, New Zealand
Quarterly magazines published in Australia
Calvinist and Reformed Christians